Histoires Naturelles is Nolwenn Leroy's second album. It was released on 5 December 2005 in France. Most of the songs were written by the French singer Laurent Voulzy and Nolwenn Leroy herself. The title track was written in English by Yasmin Shah and Arnaud Rosenthal, and "Mélusine" by Yasmin Shah. "London Fantasy" was co-written by members of English down-tempo band Sundae Club. Leroy adapted all the English-language lyrics into French.

The album reached #3 on the French charts soon after its release and has achieved platinum status. The first single from "Histoires Naturelles", "Nolwenn Ohwo!", reached #1 and the second extract "Histoire Naturelle" was #30. The third single released was "Mon Ange"; it managed to peak at #14 on the French Download Singles Chart. "J'aimais Tant L'Aimer" was only a promotional single.

Track listing
 "Nolwenn Ohwo!" — 4:34
 "L'Enfant cerf-volant" — 3:38
 "Reste encore" — 3:44
 "Mon Ange" — 4:22
 "Histoire Naturelle" — 3:53
 "Rien de mieux au monde" — 3:29
 "Mystère" — 3:54
 "Les chimères" (instrumental) — 0:51
 "Le Rêve des filles" — 5:07
 "Endormie" — 2:27
 "London Fantasy" — 3:53
 "Mélusine" — 3:56
 "J'aimais tant l'aimer" — 4:40

Certifications

Charts

References

2005 albums
Nolwenn Leroy albums
French-language albums
Universal Music France albums
Mercury Records albums